Colwellia chukchiensis is a Gram-negative, facultatively anaerobic, psychrotolerant and motile bacterium from the genus of Colwellia which has been isolated from sea water from the Chukchi Sea.

References

 

Alteromonadales
Bacteria described in 2011